"That Song Is Driving Me Crazy" is a song written and recorded by American country music artist Tom T. Hall. It was released in May 1974 as the lead single from the album, Country Is. The song peaked at number 2 on both the U.S. and Canadian country singles charts.

Chart performance

References

External links 
 

1974 singles
Tom T. Hall songs
Songs written by Tom T. Hall
Song recordings produced by Jerry Kennedy
1974 songs